Paolo Torrisi (born Maurizio Torresan, Milan, Italy 15 May 1950 – Milan, Italy 7 December 2005) was an Italian actor and voice actor. He is notable for dubbing of adult Goku, in Dragon Ball, Dragon Ball Z, Dragon Ball GT and in the List of Dragon Ball films (second dubbing in 2003).
He was also the adapter of italian dialogues and dubbing director in many films and cartoons at Merak Film, including Dragon Ball. He died at San Raffaele Hospital in Segrate of a biliary tract obstruction.

Voice work
(Italian version)
Cyborg Kuro-chan (TV) : Dubbing Director
Doraemon: (TV 1/1973) : Dubbing Director (second dub)
Doraemon: (TV 2/1979) : Dubbing Director (new dub)
Doraemon: Nobita in Dorabian Nights (movie) : Dubbing Director, Dialogues
Doraemon: Nobita to Kumo no Ōkoku (movie) : Dubbing Director, Dialogues
Dragon Ball GT: A Hero's Legacy (special) : Dubbing Director
Dragon Ball Movie 1: Curse of the Blood Rubies : Dubbing Director (2nd edition)
Dragon Ball Movie 2: Sleeping Princess in Devil's Castle : Dubbing Director (2nd edition)
Dragon Ball Movie 3: Mystical Adventure : Dubbing Director (2nd edition)
Dragon Ball Movie 4: The Path to Power: Dubbing Director (2nd edition)
Dragon Ball Z Movie 10: Broly Second Coming: Dubbing Director (2nd edition)
Dragon Ball Z Movie 11: Bio-Broly: Dubbing Director (2nd edition)
Dragon Ball Z Movie 12: Fusion Reborn: Dubbing Director (2nd edition)
Dragon Ball Z Movie 13: Wrath of the Dragon: Dubbing Director (2nd edition)
Dragon Ball Z Movie 1: Dead Zone : Dubbing Director (2nd edition)
Dragon Ball Z Movie 2: The World's Strongest : Dubbing Director (2nd edition)
Dragon Ball Z Movie 3: The Tree of Might : Dubbing Director (2nd edition)
Dragon Ball Z Movie 4: Lord Slug : Dubbing Director (2nd edition)
Dragon Ball Z Movie 5: Cooler's Revenge : Dubbing Director (2nd edition)
Dragon Ball Z Movie 6: Return of Cooler : Dubbing Director (2nd edition)
Dragon Ball Z Movie 7: Super Android 13 : Dubbing Director (2nd edition)
Dragon Ball Z Movie 8: The Legendary Super Saiyan : Dubbing Director (2nd edition)
Dragon Ball Z Movie 9: Bojack Unbound : Dubbing Director (2nd edition)
Dragon Ball Z Special 1: Bardock, The Father of Goku : Dubbing Director (2nd edition)
Dragon Ball Z Special 2: The History of Trunks : Dubbing Director (2nd edition)
Fortune Quest L (TV) : Dubbing Director
Grimm Masterpiece Theater (TV) : Dubbing Director, Dialogues
Idol Tenshi Yōkoso Yōko (TV) : Dubbing Director
Kaiketsu Zorro (TV) : Dubbing Director
Kiss me Licia : Andrea
Maple Town Stories (TV) : Dubbing Director
New Grimm Masterpiece Theater (TV) : Dubbing Director, Dialogues
New Maple Town Stories (TV) : Dubbing Director
Shin Hakkenden (TV) : Dubbing Director
Shirayuki Hime no Densetsu (TV) : Dubbing Director, Dialogues
Tico and Friends (TV) : Dubbing Director

Cast in:
(Italian version)
The Adventures of Jimmy Neutron: Boy Genius as Carl Wheezer 
Adventures of Little El Cid (TV) as Ruy
Ai Shite Knight (TV) as Andrea
Ai Shoujo Pollyanna Monogatari (TV) as Jamie
Aoki Densetsu Shoot! (TV) as Fratello di Cindy
Bakusō Kyōdai Let's & Go!! (TV) as Ricky (Jet 'Let's' Saiba)
Bakusō Kyōdai Let's & Go!! Max (TV) as Ricky; Ricky (Jet 'Let's' Saiba)
Bakusō Kyōdai Let's & Go!! WGP (TV) as Ricky (Jet 'Let's' Saiba)
Beyblade: V-Force (TV) as Jim
Bosco Daibōken (TV) as Robby
(The) Bush Baby (TV) as Micky
City Hunter (TV) as Tommaso (ep 12)
Cyborg Kuro-chan (TV); Maligno; Robot Creafuoco
Descendants of Darkness (TV) as Hijiri
Dragon Ball (TV) as Goku da Adulto; Junior (Piccolo) da Bambino
Dragon Ball GT (TV) as Gogeta (ep 60); Goku da adulto
Dragon Ball GT: A Hero's Legacy (special) as Goku
Dragon Ball Z (TV) as Goku da Adulto; Vegekou (Vegeth)
Dragon Ball Z Movie 10: Broly - Second Coming as Goku (2nd edition)
Dragon Ball Z Movie 11: Bio-Broly as Goku (2nd edition)
Dragon Ball Z Movie 12: Fusion Reborn as Gogeta (2nd edition); Goku (2nd edition)
Dragon Ball Z Movie 13: Wrath of the Dragon as Goku (2nd edition)
Dragon Ball Z Movie 1: Dead Zone as Goku (2nd edition)
Dragon Ball Z Movie 2: The World's Strongest as Goku (2nd edition)
Dragon Ball Z Movie 3: The Tree of Might as Goku (2nd edition)
Dragon Ball Z Movie 4: Lord Slug as Goku (2nd edition)
Dragon Ball Z Movie 5: Cooler's Revenge as Goku (2nd edition)
Dragon Ball Z Movie 6: Return of Cooler as Goku (2nd edition)
Dragon Ball Z Movie 7: Super Android 13 as Goku (2nd edition)
Dragon Ball Z Movie 8: The Legendary Super Saiyan as Goku (2nd edition)
Dragon Ball Z Movie 9: Bojack Unbound as Goku (2nd edition)
Dragon Ball Z Special 1: Bardock, The Father of Goku as Goku (2nd edition)
Honō no Tōkyūji Dodge Danpei (TV) as Marco
Honoo no Alpen Rose: Judy & Randy (TV) as Randy da bambino
Huckleberry Finn Monogatari (TV) as Huckleberry Finn
Idol Densetsu Eriko (TV) as Gianluca
Jungle Book: Shounen Mowgli (TV) as Mowgli
(*The) Kabocha Wine (TV) as Norman (eps 40-95)
Katri, Girl of the Meadows (TV) as Martin
Kirby: Right Back At Ya! (TV) as Tokkori
A Little Princess Sara (TV) as Donald Carmichael
Magic Knight Rayearth (TV) as Jack
Magic Knight Rayearth 2 (TV 2) as Jack
Magical Angel Creamy Mami (TV) as Mamoru Hidaka
Magical Fairy Persia (TV) as Dodo; Norinobu
Magical Star Magical Emi (TV) as B. Junior
Manga Sarutobi Sasuke (TV) as Sasuke
One Piece (TV) as Kobi
Planet Robot Danguard Ace (TV) as Arin (Takuma Ichimonji)
Pokémon (TV) as Rudy (ep 103)
Puss 'n Boots (movie) as Pierre (old dub)
Robin Hood no Daibōken (TV) as March
Robotech (U.S. TV) as Jason Minmei (The Macross Saga TV Edition); Max Sterling (The Macross Saga TV Edition)
Romeo and the Black Brothers (TV) as Anselmo
Sailor Moon (TV) as Sam
Sailor Moon R (TV) as Sam
Sailor Moon S (TV) as Sam
Sailor Moon Sailor Stars (TV) as Sam
Sailor Moon SuperS (TV) as Sam (Tsukino Shingo)
Saint Seiya (TV) as Lear
(The) Super Dimension Cavalry Southern Cross (TV) as Max Sterling
(The) Super Dimension Fortress Macross: Do You Remember Love? (movie) as Kazikaki
Tico and Friends (TV) as Toma'
Time Trouble Tondekeman! (TV) as Gavino
Tongari Bōshi no Memoru (TV) as Michel; Nicky
Tongari Bōshi no Memoru: Marielle no Hōsekibako (OAV) as Nicky
Touch (TV) as Maurizio
Urusei Yatsura: Beautiful Dreamer (movie) as Ataru
Vampire Hunter D (OAV) as Dan

References 

1951 births
2005 deaths
20th-century Italian male actors
Italian male voice actors
Italian male child actors
Italian voice directors
21st-century Italian male actors